Last Letters from Hav  is a Booker Prize-shortlisted 1985 novel by Welsh writer Jan Morris. Last Letters from Hav was republished in 2006 together with Hav of the Myrmidons and an introduction by Ursula K. Le Guin in a collected volume entitled Hav.

Plot summary
Last Letters from Hav is a narrative account of the author's six-month visit to the fictional country of Hav. The novel is written in the form of travel literature. The work is structured in an episodic format with each chapter corresponding to a month spent in Hav. Hav itself is imagined to be a cosmopolitan small independent peninsula located somewhere in the eastern Mediterranean. The novel proceeds with little in the way of connecting plot but contains several episodes describing the author's subjective experience in Hav. The author narrates a string of evocative episodes including visiting a languid casino, a courteous man claiming to be the true Caliph, watching a citywide roof race, and a visit to the mysterious British agency. The novel concludes with the author's invited visit to a strange ritual conclave where she observes several cowled men whom she thinks she might recognize as her acquaintances from her time in Hav. The author then recounts the rise of strange and ill-defined tensions in the country. The author decides to leave the country amidst the growing unrest. On the last line of the novel the author writes that she could, from the train station, see warships approaching on the horizon.

Genre

Last Letters from Hav and its sequel Hav of the Myrmidons are works of imaginative fiction. The similarity in style to travel literature and the evocative nature of the fiction make genre classification difficult. However Ursula K. Le Guin notes in her introduction to the collected volume Hav that the work is clearly a work of science fiction as it uses imaginative fiction to address issues raised by the social sciences.

Reception
Upon publication the work received a generally positive reception with reviewers noting the genre confusion with travel literature and Jan Morris's history as a travel writer herself.

Upon publication of Last Letters from Hav in the compilation volume Hav, the reviews of the work along with its companion Hav of the Myrmidons were overwhelmingly positive. The New York Review of Books described the book as "... dazzlingly sui-generis, part erudite travel memoir, part speculative fiction, part cautionary political tale. It transports the reader to an extraordinary place that never was, but could well be."

Awards and nominations
Last Letters from Hav was shortlisted for the Booker Prize for Fiction in 1985.

References

1985 British novels
1985 science fiction novels
British science fiction novels
Novels about cities
Novels set in fictional countries
Random House books